"Székely himnusz" ("Székely Anthem") is a 1921 poem adopted by Szekler National Council as the anthem of the Székely Land on 5 September 2009. The lyrics were written by György Csanády and its music was composed by Kálmán Mihalik.

Lyrics
Only the first stanza and the refrain (highlighted here in bold text) are officially part of the anthem, but subsequent stanzas are also occasionally sung.

Sheet music

See also
 Székelys
 Flag of the Székelys
 Siebenbürgenlied

Notes

References

External links
 Print of Székely Himnusz
 National Anthem page with Sheet Music

Hungarian songs
Hungarian patriotic songs
Regional songs
1921 songs
European anthems
Székely Land
Székely symbols